Oliver Reck (born 27 February 1965) is a German football manager and former player.

In a 20-year professional career, he played as a goalkeeper and was best known for his stints with Werder Bremen and Schalke 04, for whom he appeared in more than 500 official games combined, 471 in the Bundesliga alone.

Club career
Reck started his professional career with Kickers Offenbach in the 1983–84 Bundesliga; he played 18 matches as his team were relegated.

In 1985, he joined SV Werder Bremen, being the side's undisputed starter for 11 of his 13 seasons, while also being instrumental in the club's conquests, which included two leagues and the 1992 Cup Winners' Cup. However Reck was suspended for the 1992 European Cup Winners' Cup Final, in which he was replaced by Jürgen Rollmann.

Reck moved to FC Schalke 04 in 1998, aged 33, still amassing a further 112 league matches. In his last season, he played second-fiddle to Frank Rost, and chose to retire. Although Oliver Kahn holds the record for most matches without conceding goals in the league, at 180 in a total of 515 matches, Reck is the most effective goalkeeper, not conceding a goal in 173 of 471 matches, with an "effectivity rate" of 0.367, versus Kahn's 0.349.

On 9 February 2002, in his penultimate year, Reck scored a penalty kick for Schalke in a 4–0 home win against FC St. Pauli.

International career
Reck played once for Germany, on 4 June 1996 in a 9–1 friendly win against Liechtenstein. He was a member of the 1996 European Championship-winning squad.

Managerial career
After retiring, he became the goalkeeping coach at Schalke 04. After the sacking of Fred Rutten in March 2009, he became interim manager, alongside Youri Mulder and Mike Büskens until the end of the season.

Reck replaced Milan Šašić as manager of MSV Duisburg on an interim basis on 28 October 2011. His first match was a 3–0 loss against 1860 München on 30 October 2011. Reck was later made permanent manager, but he was sacked on 27 August 2012 just 3 matches into the new season.

In July 2013, Reck became goalkeeper coach at Fortuna Düsseldorf. Following the sacking of Mike Büskens he was made interim coach of Fortuna Düsseldorf on 2 December 2013. Reck finished his interim position when Fortuna Düsseldorf hired Lorenz-Günther Köstner as the new head coach, and he returned as goalkeeper coach. After Fortuna dissolved the contract with Köstner in June 2013, Reck returned to the position as head coach in Düsseldorf.

On 23 February 2015 he was sacked after only picking up a point from three matches after the winter break. His final match was a 3–1 loss the previous day against 1. FC Nürnberg.

On 27 January 2016 Oliver Reck became the coach of Regionalliga Südwest team Kickers Offenbach. However, as of 27 May 2016, the future of the club is in doubt due to heavy debts. Reck is, however, reportedly wanting to stay at the club. In April 2018 it was announced that Reck would leave Offenbach at the end of his contract on 30 June 2018.

In December 2019, fourth-tier club SSV Jeddeloh announced Reck would take over as manager on a contract until end of the 2019–20 season. In March 2020, a contract extension until summer 2021 was announced.

Managerial record

Honours
Werder Bremen
Bundesliga: 1987–88, 1992–93
DFB-Pokal: 1990–91, 1993–94; runner-up: 1988–89, 1989–90
DFL-Supercup: 1988, 1993, 1994
UEFA Cup Winners' Cup: 1991–92

Schalke 04
DFB-Pokal: 2000–01, 2001–02
DFB-Ligapokal runner-up: 2001, 2002

Germany U23
Summer Olympics Bronze medal: 1988

Germany
UEFA European Football Championship: 1996

References

External links
 
 
 

1965 births
Living people
Footballers from Frankfurt
German footballers
West German footballers
Association football goalkeepers
Bundesliga players
2. Bundesliga players
Kickers Offenbach players
SV Werder Bremen players
FC Schalke 04 players
Germany international footballers
Germany under-21 international footballers
UEFA Euro 1996 players
UEFA European Championship-winning players
Olympic footballers of West Germany
Footballers at the 1988 Summer Olympics
German football managers
2. Bundesliga managers
FC Schalke 04 managers
MSV Duisburg managers
Fortuna Düsseldorf managers
Kickers Offenbach managers
Olympic bronze medalists for West Germany
Olympic medalists in football
Medalists at the 1988 Summer Olympics